Reinhold Weiss (born 1934) is a German-born industrial designer who lives in Tucson, Arizona creating products now considered icons of the Functionalist school of industrial design,  and led to the success of the Braun brand.
Weiss's designs for Braun include but are not limited to the following:

 HT1 Toaster, 1961;
 HL1 Desk Fan, 1961;
 HL1/11 Tabletop fan, 1961;
 HE1 Kettle, 1962
 HLD 2, 23/231 Hair Dryer, 1964;
 KSM 1 Coffee Grinder, 1967;
 H7 Heater, 1967;
 HL70 Desk Fan (with Jurgen Greubel), 1971; and
 KMM 1 Coffee Grinder. 1965

Examples of Weiss's designs are in the permanent collections of the Museum of Modern Art, Indianapolis Museum of Art, and the Israel Museum.

References

1934 births
Living people
German industrial designers